Marlisa Wahlbrink (born April 10, 1973, in Porto Alegre), also known as Maravilha, is a retired Brazilian football player and goalkeeper in the women's national team. She played and trained internationally for Grêmio Foot-Ball Porto Alegrense, and also, served as a two-time member of the Brazilian national team at the 2000 and 2004 Summer Olympics.

In 1997 Wahlbrink was playing for São Paulo FC.

References

External links
Profile – UOL Esporte 

1973 births
Living people
Brazilian women's footballers
Footballers at the 2000 Summer Olympics
Footballers at the 2004 Summer Olympics
Olympic footballers of Brazil
Olympic silver medalists for Brazil
Olympic medalists in football
Medalists at the 2004 Summer Olympics
Brazil women's international footballers
Footballers from Porto Alegre
Women's association football goalkeepers
1999 FIFA Women's World Cup players
São Paulo FC (women) players